Lampetis dilaticollis is a beetle of the family Buprestidae.

Description
Elytra, pronotum and antennae are black with blue and violet tinge. Elytra show brassy-cupreous punctures and impressions. The surface of the pronotum is smooth, without punctures. Ventral surface is bluish black.

Distribution
This species can be found in Mexico.

References

Buprestidae
Woodboring beetles
Beetles described in 1882